Operation Panama Express is a long-running Organized Crime Drug Enforcement Task Force (OCDETF), comprising participants from the Coast Guard Investigative Service, the Federal Bureau of Investigation, Immigration and Customs Enforcement (ICE), the Drug Enforcement Administration, and the United States Attorney's Office for the Middle District of Florida.

According to a March 2006 Congressional testimony by DEA Chief of Operations Michael Braun, Operation Panama Express has resulted in the seizure of 350 metric tons (392 tons) of cocaine, and the arrests of 1,107 individuals. The OCDETF is based in Tampa, Florida, and focuses primarily on interrupting cocaine shipments en route from South America—especially Colombia.

The 59-foot-long, steel and fiberglass craft was detected by a U.S. Navy aircraft as part of Operation Panama Express.

Joaquin Mario Valencia-Trujillo 
The most notable individual arrested as a result of Operation Panama Express is Colombian Cali cartel kingpin Joaquin Mario Valencia-Trujillo. Valencia was arrested on January 31, 2003 in Bogota, Colombia, and extradited in 2004 to the United States. The lead witness in Valencia's trial was Jose Castrillon-Henao, a former Cali cartel maritime smuggling chief who became an FBI informant in 1999. Valencia was sentenced to a prison term of 40 years, and ordered to forfeit $110 million.

References

External links 
Congressional Testimony by Michael Braun (March 30, 2006)
April 16, 2005 Cocaine Seizure detailed in Coast Guard Magazine (April 27, 2005)
U.S. Dept. of Treasury names Trujillo Specially Designated Narcotics Trafficker (March 27, 2003)
WTOP: "Testimony Begins in Alleged Kingpin Trial" (July 10, 2006)
The Tampa Tribune: "Trial Offers 'Miami Vice' Scenario" (July 5, 2006)
The Tampa Tribune: "The Confidential Witness" (July 10, 2006) 
The St. Petersburg Times: "Drug Trial Could Shake Colombia" (July 9, 2006)

Drug Enforcement Administration operations
Law enforcement operations in the United States
Operations against organized crime in the United States